Finn McNicholas aka Ultre (born 26 September 1981)  is an electronic music musician from England.

Discography

Albums 

 2010 Tape/Recorder

EP's 

 2009 Watch Your Thoughts EP Northern Resource records

Singles and promos

2009 Watch Your Thoughts EP (promo, 12") Mesk Records

Videos 

2007 Ultre – Ionisation (Short film directed by Flat-e)
2007 Ultre – Shadowplay (Short film directed by Flat-e)

Tracks appear on 

 2006 Another Generic Label Sampler Vol. 1,000,000 Concrete Plastic
 2006 Overkill  	
 2006 Exhibition #3 Audiobulb Records

See also
Mesk Records

References
 The Wire The Wire (2009)
 Finn McNicholas Interview / Audiobulb Release Page

External links
 
 
 [ Ultre – Allmusic]

1981 births
British electronic musicians
British experimental musicians
Intelligent dance musicians
Living people
Remixers